Hilaire Deprez (25 February 1922 – 15 September 1957) was a Belgian sprint canoer who competed in the late 1940s and early 1950s. Competing in two Summer Olympics, he earned his best finish of eighth in the K-2 10000 m event at London in 1948.

References

Mention of Hilaire Deprez's death

1922 births
1957 deaths
Belgian male canoeists
Canoeists at the 1948 Summer Olympics
Canoeists at the 1952 Summer Olympics
Olympic canoeists of Belgium
20th-century Belgian people